Dällikon is a municipality in the district of Dielsdorf in the canton of Zürich in Switzerland.

History

Dällikon is first mentioned in 870  as Tellinghovon.
In 1843 the village of Dänikon left Dällikon to become an independent municipality.

Geography
Of this area, 45% is used for agricultural purposes, while 32.4% is forested. Of the rest of the land, 22.1% is settled (buildings or roads) and the remainder (0.4%) is non-productive (rivers, glaciers or mountains).

The municipality is located in the Furttal on the northern flank of the Altberg.

Demographics
, 24.4% of the population was made up of foreign nationals. Over the last 10 years the population has grown at a rate of 17.6%. Most of the population speaks German (83.7%), with Italian being second most common ( 4.0%) and Turkish being third ( 2.7%).

In the 2007 election the most popular party was the SVP which received 50.4% of the vote.  The next three most popular parties were the CSP (12.1%), the SPS (12%) and the FDP (9%).

The age distribution of the population is children and teenagers (0–19 years old) make up 22.9% of the population, while adults (20–64 years old) make up 70% and seniors (over 64 years old) make up 7.1%.  The entire Swiss population is generally well educated.  In Dällikon about 72.9% of the population (between age 25-64) have completed either non-mandatory upper secondary education or additional higher education (either University or a Fachhochschule).

Dällikon has an unemployment rate of 3.12%.  , there were 45 people employed in the primary economic sector and about 13 businesses involved in this sector.  1220 people are employed in the secondary sector and there are 74 businesses in this sector.  1156 people are employed in the tertiary sector, with 135 businesses in this sector.

The historical population is given in the following table:

Transportation 
Buchs-Dällikon railway station is a stop of the S-Bahn Zürich on the line S6.  Additionally, bus lines 491 and 449 run through Dällikon.

References

External links 

  

Municipalities of the canton of Zürich